Luke Richard White, 6th Baron Annaly (born 1953), is a British hereditary peer and former Government Whip in the House of Lords, who sat on the Conservative benches.

Background and education
The only son of the first-class cricketer, the 5th Baron Annaly, and Lady Marye Isabel Pepys (died 1958), eldest daughter of the 7th Earl of Cottenham, his parents divorced in 1956 when he was two.

Educated at Eton College and the Royal Military Academy Sandhurst, he later attended the Royal Agricultural College, Cirencester, receiving a Diploma in Rural Estate Management.

White joined the Royal Hussars becoming Lieutenant in 1974, and served in Northern Ireland.

Lord Annaly succeeded upon his father's death on 30 September 1990 as a Baron in the Peerage of the United Kingdom, a title created in 1863.

Family
Lord Annaly married Caroline Nina Garnett (born 1960), younger daughter of Colonel Robert Hugh Garnett MBE and Elizabeth Ann Arthur, in 1983. They have four children, including an only son and heir apparent, Luke White (born 1990); their daughters are Lavinia (born 1987), Iona (born 1989) and Clemmie White (born 2001).

After divorcing, the Lady Annaly married secondly, in 2015, Richard Bott FCA.

Politics
House of Lords
Appointed a Lord-in-Waiting in 1994, Lord Annaly served as a Lords' Whip in the Conservative government of John Major with responsibility for the Home Office and Ministry of Defence. With the passage of the Act of 1999, Annaly along with almost all other hereditary peers lost his automatic right to sit in the House of Lords.

At pro-hunting demonstrations in September 2004 Annaly spoke to the BBC in favour of continuation of hunting, stating it is no longer an elitist activity; "I fear it is being done for good, old-fashioned misconceived ideas about the sort of people who go hunting.  People have come from all over the country and all sections of society. It's no longer a privileged exclusive activity."

District Council
From 2007 to 2011, Lord Annaly was Councillor for a single-member ward of Cherwell District Council representing the Conservatives, having ousted a Liberal Democrat.

Subsequent career
Lord Annaly serves on his local (ecclesiastical) Parochial Church Council as Church Warden and is elected to the Anglican Oxford Deanery Synod.

An Officer of the Order of St John, he is a member of Marylebone Cricket Club, a Freeman of the Haberdashers' Company and a steward for the British Horseracing Authority at Wolverhampton, Warwick and Towcester racecourses.

See also
 Baron Annaly
 Earl of Bantry

References

Further reading
Peter W. Hammond, editor, The Complete Peerage or a History of the House of Lords and All its Members From the Earliest Times, Volume XIV: Addenda & Corrigenda (Stroud, Gloucestershire, U.K.: Sutton Publishing, 1998), page 28.
Charles Mosley, editor, Burke's Peerage & Baronetage, 106th edition, 2 volumes (Crans, Switzerland: Burke's Peerage (Genealogical Books) Ltd, 1999), Volume 1, page 78.

1954 births
Living people
People from Oxfordshire
English Anglicans
People educated at Eton College
Alumni of the Royal Agricultural University
Graduates of the Royal Military Academy Sandhurst
Conservative Party (UK) hereditary peers
Honourable Corps of Gentlemen at Arms
Conservative Party (UK) Baronesses- and Lords-in-Waiting
Officers of the Order of St John
Royal Hussars officers
British military personnel of The Troubles (Northern Ireland)
People in horse racing
Eldest sons of British hereditary barons
Place of birth missing (living people)
Luke 6
Annaly